The Way I Am is a 2006 album by MC Mong. This is MC Mong's third album. This album comes in a digital disc format. For MC Mong's third album, he invited M-Flo's former member Lisa. His third album also includes duets with Park Hyo Shin, Ivy, and MayBee.

"A Letter To You Part 2" is the sequel to his first album's "Letter To You" which featured Lyn as the female vocalist.

He won many hip-hop awards and Bonsang awards and gained much more popularity with this album.

Track listing 
News
아이스크림(Ice Cream)
너에게 쓰는 편지 Part 2 (A Letter To You Part 2) (Feat. Lisa)
The Winner (Feat. Crown J)
기도 (feat. 박효신) (Prayer Feat. Park Hyo Shin)
생활의 발견 (Discovery Of Life)
허클베리몽의 모험 (Adventures Of Huckleberry Mong)
독 (毒) (Drugs)
벙어리 (Mute)
The Way I Am (feat. MayBee & 길(리쌍)(Kill)
Lost In Music
못된 영화 (feat. IVY)(Incomplete Movie Feat. Ivy)
비밀(Secret) 
Beautiful Day
생활의 재발견 (Rediscovery of Life)

2006 albums
MC Mong albums